James Noel Elliott (1947 – 26 February 2021) was an Irish rugby union player. He played in the back row for Dolphin RFC and Munster.

Career

Elliott enjoyed his first rugby successes when he won Senior Cup and Junior Cup medals with Presentation Brothers College at prop forward and also played for Munster Schools for two seasons. He led  the Dolphin U20 team to win the Dooradoyle Cup, a 7-a-side competition, beating University College Dublin in the final thanks to his two tries. As club captain during the 1972-73 season he guided Dolphin to the Munster Senior League title. Elliott subsequently changed positions to wing forward, a move which suited him, as he went on play many times for Munster, including in a narrow loss to Australia, while he also made the national squad for a period.

Death

Elliott died aged 74 on 26 February 2021.

Honours

Presentation Brothers College
Munster Schools Rugby Senior Cup: 1965, 1966

Dolphin
Munster Senior League: 1973 (c)

References

1947 births
2021 deaths
Irish rugby union players
Ireland international rugby union players
Munster Rugby players
Dolphin RFC players
Rugby union players from County Cork